Fairfield Porter (June 10, 1907 – September 18, 1975) was an American painter and art critic. He was the fourth of five children of James Porter, an architect, and Ruth Furness Porter, a poet from a literary family.  He was the brother of photographer Eliot Porter and the brother-in-law of federal Reclamation Commissioner Michael W. Straus.

While a student at Harvard, Porter majored in fine arts; he continued his studies at the Art Students' League when he moved to New York City in 1928.  His studies at the Art Students' League predisposed him to produce socially relevant art and, although the subjects would change, he continued to produce realist work for the rest of his career. He would be criticized and revered for continuing his representational style in the midst of the Abstract Expressionist movement.

His subjects were primarily landscapes, domestic interiors and portraits of family, friends and fellow artists, many of them affiliated with the New York School of writers, including John Ashbery, Frank O'Hara, and James Schuyler. Many of his paintings were set in or around the family summer house on Great Spruce Head Island, Maine and the family home at 49 South Main Street, Southampton, New York.

His painterly vision, which encompassed a fascination with nature and the ability to reveal extraordinariness in ordinary life, was heavily indebted to the French painters Pierre Bonnard and Édouard Vuillard. John Ashbery wrote of him: "Characteristically, [Porter] tended to prefer the late woolly Vuillards to the early ones everyone likes".

Porter said once, "When I paint, I think that what would satisfy me is to express what Bonnard said Renoir told him: 'make everything more beautiful.'"

Work in public collections 
Porter bequeathed about 250 of his works to the Parrish Art Museum.
 Laurence at the Piano (1953), New Britain Museum of American Art.
 Katie and Anne (1955), Hirshhorn Museum and Sculpture Garden
 Still Life with Casserole (1955), Smithsonian American Art Museum
 Elaine de Kooning (1957), Metropolitan Museum of Art
 Frank O' Hara (1957), Toledo Museum of Art
 Maine Coast (1958), Metropolitan Museum of Art
 Chrysanthemums (1958), Wadsworth Atheneum
 Schwenk, (1959), Museum of Modern Art
 Children in a Field (1960), Whitney Museum of American Art
 Boathouses (1961), Hirshhorn Museum and Sculpture Garden
 The Garden Road (1962), Whitney Museum of American Art
 Jerry at the Piano (1962), Hirshhorn Museum and Sculpture Garden
 Jimmy and Liz (1963), Pennsylvania Academy of the Fine Arts
 The Screen Porch (1964), Whitney Museum of American Art
 Flowers by the Sea (1965), Museum of Modern Art
 Interior in Sunlight (1965), Brooklyn Museum
 The Mirror (1966), Nelson-Atkins Museum of Art
 Anne in a Striped Dress (1967), Parrish Art Museum
 Under the Elms (1971), Pennsylvania Academy of the Fine Arts
 Sunrise on South Main Street (1973), Metropolitan Museum of Art
 The Dock (1974–75), Farnsworth Art Museum
 Near Union Square--Looking up Park Avenue (1975), Metropolitan Museum of Art
 October Interior (1963), Crystal Bridges Museum of American Art
 Apple Blossoms I (1974), The Christmas Tree (1971), Street Scene (1969), Muscarelle Museum of Art

References

External links 
 Fairfield Porter Papers Online at the Smithsonian Archives of American Art
 Ken Moffatt, The Art of Fairfield Porter: An American Painter Celebrated a Sense of Place, 17 Feb 2010, Artes Magazine
  Alex Carnevale, In Which Fairfield Porter Looked So Young For His Age, January 13, 2011
 David Herd, Waiting for the mailboat (Letters of James Schuyler), The Guardian, 28 May 2005
 Audio recording of Fairfield Porter, October 29, 1963, from Maryland Institute College of Art's Decker Library, Internet Archive

1907 births
1975 deaths
Harvard University alumni
American art critics
20th-century American painters
American male painters
Modern painters
Art Students League of New York alumni
People from Winnetka, Illinois
20th-century American non-fiction writers
Painters from Illinois
20th-century American male artists